The 2002 Washington State Cougars football team represented Washington State University as a member of Pacific-10 Conference the 2002 NCAA Division I-A football season. The team was led by Mike Price in his 14th and final season as head coach, and played its home games on campus at Martin Stadium in Pullman, Washington.

Washington State finished the regular season with an overall record of 10–2 and mark of 7–1 in the conference play, sharing the Pac-10 title with USC. They defeated the Trojans in overtime in early October, but lost to unranked Washington in triple overtime in the Apple Cup at Pullman; WSU regrouped and beat UCLA by three touchdowns two weeks later. The seventh-ranked Cougars were invited to the Rose Bowl on New Year's Day, but were soundly defeated by the Oklahoma Sooners, and dropped to tenth in the final rankings.

The Rose Bowl was the final game for Price at Washington State. He left to become the head football coach at the University of Alabama, but never coached a game for the Crimson Tide. Bill Doba, longtime defensive coordinator for the cougars, was promoted to head coach for the 2003 season, and he led the Cougar program through 2007.

Schedule

Roster

Coaching staff
 Head coach: Mike Price
 Assistants: Robb Akey, Chris Ball, Bob Connelly, Bill Doba, Kasey Dunn, Mike Levenseller, Robin Pflugrad, Aaron Price, Mike Walker

Game summaries

USC

    
    
    
    
    
    
    
    
    
    

Washington State's first win over USC in Pullman in sixteen years.

2002 Cougars in professional football
 Hamza Abdullah
 Calvin Armstrong
 Erik Coleman
 Devard Darling
 Jason David
 Rien Long
 Karl Paymah
 Marcus Trufant

References

Washington State
Washington State Cougars football seasons
Pac-12 Conference football champion seasons
Washington State Cougars football